The Tirupati–Narsapur Express is an Express train belonging to South Central Railway zone that runs between  and  in India. It is currently being operated with 17403/17404 train numbers on a daily basis.

Service

The 17403/Tirupati–Narsapur Express has an average speed of 50 km/hr and covers 526 km in 10h 35m. The 17404/Narasapur–Tirupati Express has an average speed of 46 km/hr and covers 526 km in 11h 20m.

Route and halts 

The important halts of the train are:

Coach composition

The train has standard ICF rakes with a max speed of 110 kmph. The train consists of 19 coaches:

 2 AC III Tier
 9 Sleeper coaches
 4 General Unreserved
 4 Seating cum Luggage Rake

Traction

Both trains are hauled by a Vijayawada Loco Shed based WAM-4P electric locomotive from Tirupati to Narasapuram.

Rake sharing

The train shares its rake with 17401/17402 Tirupati–Machilipatnam Link Express.

See also 

 Tirupati railway station
 Narasapuram railway station
 Tirupati–Machilipatnam Link Express

Notes

References

External links 

 17403/Tirupati–Narsapur Express India Rail Info
 17404/Narsapur–Tirupati Express India Rail Info

Transport in Tirupati
Express trains in India
Rail transport in Andhra Pradesh